Nadine Al Rassi (born 4 September 1979 in Rahbeh) is a Lebanese actress. She began her career in 1999. She has won the Murex d'Or three times; her most famous wins were for Ghanouja bea in 2006, and Passion crime in 2016.

Early life and career
Al Rassi was born in Rahbeh village in North Governorate to artistic family. Her father, Khalil Al Rassi, is a Lebanese oud player from  the village of Cheikh Taba in Akkar, Lebanon. Her mother is a Syrian from Marmarita. Her younger brother Georges Al Rassi was a singer.

She began her career as a model, and appeared in music videos for Fadl Shaker and Wael Jassar. Her first acting role was in the Al bashwat TV series in 1999. In 2007, she won the Murex d'Or award for best supporting actress in Ghanouja bea (Dad's Girl). A year later, she won the award for best main role actress for her role in the TV series My son. In 2010, she won the same award for the third time for best actress as a life achievement. She also won the Oscar stars award in 2015 as best actress for her role in the Love story TV series. She also competed in the TV reality show Celebrity Duets Arab World, in which she won the first place 2006 after competing against Ameer Karara. She also won the TV game show Celebrity Splash! in 2013, and donated her award to the Lebanese Red Cross.

Personal life
Al Rassi has been married and divorced three times. Her first marriage was in 1996, when she was only seventeen years old, to Hatem Hadshiti. They divorced after a couple of years, after she gave birth to her first son, Mark. Her second marriage was to Lebanese businessman and actor Gescard Abi Nader in 2001. She gave birth to two sons from him, Marcel and Karl, but they divorced in 2016. Her third marriage was to a TV presenter, Raja Nasser El Deen, in 2017, but they divorced after one year. 

After her divorce from Gescard Abi Nader, she entered a legal battle for the custody of her two sons from him. Shortly after her divorce, there were allegations that she had had an affair with a married man. The footage leaks show many intimate pictures with a dentist, Raed Lattouf; the two accused each other of publishing these pictures. 

Al Rassi also suffered a great deal from depression, and admitted to attempting to commit suicide by throwing herself from a car, but was saved by her son Mark.

She was in a controversy, after she stated that she is Muslahiya and believes in both Christianity and Islam. She was also criticized for her comments against Syrian refugees in Lebanon, but she later apologized for these comments.

In late 2018, she blamed her family for disowning her when she needed help. However, during the 2019–20 Lebanese protests, Al Rassi accused the Banque du Liban of taking her house, and her inability of renting anymore.

Works

Movies

Series

Stage

References

External links
 
 

1979 births
Living people
21st-century Lebanese actresses
Lebanese film actresses
Lebanese television actresses
Lebanese stage actresses
Lebanese female models
Lebanese people of Syrian descent
People from Akkar Governorate
Lebanese Christians
Lebanese Muslims